The 2020–21 Mountain West Conference men's basketball season began with practices in October 2020, followed by the start of the 2020–21 NCAA Division I men's basketball season in November. Conference play began in January 2021 and concluded in March 2021.

Preseason Awards
The preseason coaches' poll was announced by the league office on November 10, 2020.

Preseason men's basketball coaches poll
(First place votes in parenthesis)
 San Diego State (14) 211
 Boise State (4) 188
 Utah State (2) 177
 UNLV 160
 Colorado State 141
 Nevada 114
 New Mexico 106
 Fresno State 93
 Wyoming 59
 Air Force 39
 San Jose State 32

Honors
Preseason honors were announced by the league office on November 10, 2020.

Conference matrix

All-Mountain West awards

Mountain West men's basketball weekly awards

References